Vagankovo Cemetery, established in 1771, is located in the Presnya district of Moscow. It started in the aftermath of the Moscow plague riot of 1771 outside the city proper, so as to prevent the contagion from spreading.

Half a million people are estimated to have  been buried at Vagankovo throughout its history. As of 2010, the existing cemetery contains more than 100,000 graves. The vast necropolis contains the mass graves from the Battle of Borodino, the Battle of Moscow, and the Khodynka Tragedy. It is the burial site for a number of people from the artistic and sports community of Russia and the old Soviet Union. William Taubman claims that during the Great Purge "alcohol-soused guards would execute weeping prisoners" after they had dug their graves in the cemetery.

The cemetery is served by several Orthodox churches constructed between 1819 and 1823 in the Muscovite version of the Empire style.

Notable burials 
 Nadezhda Lamanova (1861–1941), fashion and costume designer
  (1900–1979), writer, journalist, Russian Civil War and Second World War participant, Union of Soviet Writers
 Aleksandr Abdulov (1953–2008), actor
 Vasily Agapkin (1884–1964), musician, author of the song "Farewell of Slavianka"
 Boris Andreyev (1915–1982), actor
 Inga Artamonova (1936–1966), world speed-skating champion
 Grigori Chukhrai (1921–2001), film director
 Vladimir Dal (1801–1872), lexicographer
 Sergei Grinkov (1967–1995), world & Olympic ice skating pairs champion
 Leonid Kharitonov (1930–1987), actor
 Otari Kvantrishvili (1948–1994), godfather of the Georgian mafia
 Egor Makovsky (1802–1886), accountant and artist
 Andrei Mironov (1941–1987), actor
 Bulat Okudzhava (1924–1997), poet and singer-songwriter, writer
 Vasili Oshchepkov (1892–1937), fighter
 Lyudmila Pakhomova (1946–1986), world & Olympic ice dancing pairs champion
 Mikhail Pugovkin (1923–2008), actor
 Prosh Proshian (1883–1918), Left Socialist-Revolutionary
 Alexei Savrasov (1830–1897), painter
 Gennady Shpalikov (1937–1974), poet, screenwriter
 David Shterenberg (1881–1948), artist
 Vitaly Solomin (1941–2002), actor
 Anatoly Solonitsyn (1934–1982), actor
 Nikolai Starostin (1902–1996), footballer
 Vasily Surikov (1848–1916), painter
 Yevgeny Svetlanov (1928–2002), conductor, composer, and pianist
 Igor Talkov (1956–1991), poet, singer-songwriter
 Anna Timiryova (1893–1975), poet
 Nika Turbina (1974–2002), poet
 Vasily Tropinin (1776–1857), painter
 Lev Vlassenko (1928–1996), pianist
 Vladimir Vysotsky (1938–1980), poet, singer-songwriter, actor
 Vasily Yan (1876–1954), writer
 Leonid Yengibarov (1935–1972), clown, mime, actor
 Yakov Rozval (1932–2015), engineer, inventor
 Sergei Yesenin (1895–1925), poet, husband of Isadora Duncan
 Antonina Zubkova (1920–1950), WWII bomber pilot, Heroine of the Soviet Union
 Lev Loktev (1908–1981), artillery designer
 Anastasia Filatova (1920–2001), first lady, wife of the Mongolian leader Yumjaagiin Tsedenbal
 Emil Loteanu (1936–2003), film director

References

External links
 
 

1771 establishments in the Russian Empire
Cemeteries in Moscow
 
Cultural heritage monuments of federal significance in Moscow